Cyrille "Beng" Fabello Abueg-Zaldivar (born November 18, 1978) is a Filipino politician and lawyer. She served as a member of the Philippine House of Representatives representing the 2nd District of Palawan from 2019 to 2022.

Political career

House of Representatives (2019 - 2022) 
She is one of the 70 lawmakers who voted to reject the franchise of ABS-CBN.

In the 2022 Philippine general election, Abueg lost her re-election bid to Jose Alvarez.

References

External links 
 Official Facebook page

Living people
Members of the House of Representatives of the Philippines from Palawan
Liberal Party (Philippines) politicians
1978 births